The Henty brothers were a family of seven brothers, sons of Thomas Henty and Frances Elizabeth , who are generally considered to be the first Europeans to establish a permanent agricultural settlement in Victoria, Australia. The brothers were:

 James (1800–1882), founded James Henty and Company, merchants. He married Charlotte Carter.
Henry (1833–1912), took over his father's company, inherited uncle Francis's fortune
Herbert James (1834–1902), squandered the family fortune in his brother's absence
Thomas (1836–1887), grazier and, briefly, MLC for Southern Province
a grandson Sir Denham (1903–1978), Senator for Tasmania; 
Frances Charlotte (1838–1925) who married James Balfour, a member of the Victorian Legislative Assembly and Legislative Council.
 Charles (1807–1864), banker and member of the Tasmanian House of Assembly
 William (1808–1881), solicitor, member of the Tasmanian Legislative Council for Tamar, and colonial secretary in the Weston cabinet
 Edward (1810–1878), pioneer, first permanent settler in Victoria, Australia
 Stephen George (1811–1872), member of the legislative council of Victoria, 1856–1870
 Richmond (1837-1904), author
 Walter Thomas (1856–1917), farmer at Hamilton
 John  (1813–1869), pastoralist in Victoria
 Francis (1815–1889), farmer and grazier

References

Settlers of Victoria (Australia)
Australian families
English families